The Natomas East Main Drainage Canal, also known as Steelhead Creek, flows into the American River in Sacramento County, California.

References

 
Drainage canals
Geography of Sacramento County, California